Hee-jin, also spelled Hui-jin, is a Korean unisex given name. Its meaning depends on the hanja used to write each syllable of the name. There are 24 hanja with the reading "hee" and 43 hanja with the reading "jin" on the South Korean government's official list of hanja which may be used in given names. People with this name include:

Entertainers
Park Hee-jin (actress) (born 1973), South Korean actress
Woo Hee-jin (born 1975), South Korean actress
Lee Hee-jin (born 1979), South Korean female singer, former member of Baby Vox
Jang Hee-jin (born 1983), South Korean actress
Han Ji-an (born Kim Hee-jin, 1991), South Korean actress

Sportspeople
Park Hee-jin (freestyle skier) (born 1979), South Korean female freestyle skier
Chang Hee-jin (born 1986), South Korean female swimmer
Kim Hee-jin (born 1991), South Korean female volleyball player
Kim Hee-jin (handballer) (born 1995), South Korean female handballer

Other
Park Hee-jin (poet) (1931–2015), South Korean male poet
Min Hee-jin (born 1979), South Korean female creative director

See also
List of Korean given names

References

Korean unisex given names